Edmund Fowell (c. 1598 – 27 February 1664) was an English politician who sat in the House of Commons at various times between 1646 and 1660.

Fowell was the son of John Fowell of Plymouth. He matriculated at Broadgates Hall, Oxford on 3 May 1616, aged 18. He was called to the bar at Middle Temple in 1625.
 
In August 1646, Fowell was elected Member of Parliament for Tavistock in the Long Parliament. He sat until 1648 when he was secluded under Pride's Purge. In 1656 he was elected MP for Devon for the Second Protectorate Parliament and in 1659 he was elected MP for Tavistock in the Third Protectorate Parliament.

In 1660, Fowell was elected MP for  Plymouth in the Convention Parliament in a double return. He was seated on 27 April but was replaced on 9 June 1660 by Samuel Trelawny, after which he retired.

References

 

1598 births
1664 deaths
Alumni of Broadgates Hall, Oxford
Members of the Middle Temple
Members of the Parliament of England for Tavistock
Members of the Parliament of England for Plymouth
Members of the Parliament of England (pre-1707) for Devon
English MPs 1640–1648
English MPs 1656–1658
English MPs 1659
English MPs 1660